Nizhnyaya Chatra (Tübänge Satra) is a rural locality (a village) in Tyuryushevsky Selsoviet, Buzdyaksky District, Bashkortostan, Russia. The population was 41 as of 2010. There are 2 streets.

Geography 
Nizhnyaya Chatra is located 55 km north of Buzdyak (the district's administrative centre) by road. Sevadybashevo is the nearest rural locality.

References 

Rural localities in Buzdyaksky District